Sir Gerard Braybrooke I (c. 1332 – 1 February 1403), of Colmworth, Bedfordshire and Horsenden, Buckinghamshire, was an English politician.

Family
He was the father of MPs, Gerard Braybrooke II and Reynold Braybrooke.

Career
Braybrooke was a member of parliament for Bedfordshire constituency in January 1377 and November 1390.

References

1332 births
1403 deaths
English knights
English MPs January 1377
English MPs November 1390
14th-century English politicians
People from Wycombe District
People from Buckinghamshire